Abdulrahim Abby Farah (October 22, 1919 – May 14, 2018) was a Welsh-born Somali diplomat and politician. He was Deputy Secretary General of the United Nations 1979-1990. He served as the Permanent Representative of Somalia to the United Nations, and as the Ambassador of Somalia to Ethiopia. He was the Chairperson of the PaSAGO non-governmental organization. He hailed from the 
Rer Wa’ays subdivision of the Issa Musse Habr Awal subclan of the Isaaq.

Personal life
Farah was born on 22 October 1919, in Barry, Wales, and came from the Issa Musse subclan of the Habr Awal Isaaq. His father Abby Farah, was a Somali entrepreneur and sailor, who was awarded an MBE for his community service to sailors in war time. His mother, Hilda Anderson, ran a boarding house. Racial tensions in South East Wales were high at the time, following on from the Cardiff Race Riots in June 1919.

Farah grew up in Barry, attending Gladstone Road School, and Barry Grammar School.

He earned degrees from the University College, Exeter and Balliol College, Oxford University in England. His two brothers also studied at Oxford.

Farah was married four times, and divorced twice. He met his third wife Sheila Farrell, a history teacher and speechwriter (d. 1997) at Oxford. He married his fourth wife, Hodan Goth in 2001 and had seven children in total.

Career
Farah began his diplomatic career with the Trust Territory of Somaliland administration, sent there age 17 by his father. After independence, he served with the early civilian government of the Somali Republic in various capacities from 1951 to 1961, including as Director of the Somali Information Service.

Between 1961 and 1965, Farah was Somalia's Ambassador to Ethiopia. He acted as Somalia's representative to the United Nations Economic Commission for Africa (ECA) in 1962. Ambassador Farah also represented the nation at Council of Ministers meetings of the Organisation of African Unity (OAU) in 1964 and 1965.

From 1965 to 1972, Farah was the Permanent Representative of Somalia to the United Nations in New York City.  He concurrently served as the Acting Director General of Somalia's Ministry of Foreign Affairs in 1966.

From 1969 to 1972, Farah was the Chairperson of the UN Special Committee Against Apartheid, presiding over a special session of the United Nations Security Council with Umar Ateh Galib in 1972. He acted as the Assistant Secretary-General for Special Political Questions between 1973 and 1978. Additionally, Farah served as Somalia's representative within the League of Arab States.

From 1973 to 1978, he was the Undersecretary-General for Special Political Questions, later becoming the Undersecretary General from 1979 to 1990. In 1990, Farah headed the UN Mission on ‘Progress made on the Declaration on Apartheid and its Destructive Consequences on South Africa’.

In 1998, Farah helped found the Partnership to Strengthen African Grassroots Organizations (PaSAGO). He later served as the non-governmental organization's Chairperson. Farah died in May 2018 at the age of 98. He maintained his Welsh accent throughout his life.

See also
Omar Arte Ghalib
Muhammad Haji Ibrahim Egal
Aden Adde
Nelson Mandela
Abdirashid Shermarke
Issa Musse
Habr Awal

References

External links
African Activist Archive - Ambassador Abdulrahim Abby Farah

1919 births
2018 deaths
Alumni of the University of Oxford
Ambassadors of Somalia to Ethiopia
Ethnic Somali people
Permanent Representatives of Somalia to the United Nations
Somalian diplomats
Somalian politicians
Issa Musa
Black British politicians
Welsh people of Somali descent
People from Barry, Vale of Glamorgan